is a railway station on the Hitahikosan Line in Kawara, Fukuoka, Japan, operated by Kyushu Railway Company (JR Kyushu).

Line and services
Ippommatsu Station is served by the Hitahikosan Line. One train per hour stops at the station during the daytime, increased to two per hour during the morning and evening peaks.

Adjacent stations

History
The station opened in 1997.

Surrounding area
 Magarikane Station (Heisei Chikuhō Railway Tagawa Line)
 Fukuoka Prefectural Tagawa High School

See also
 Ippommatsu Station (Saitama) in Saitama Prefecture
 List of railway stations in Japan

References

External links

  

Railway stations in Japan opened in 1997
Railway stations in Fukuoka Prefecture